The Model Trains Museum is a private museum in the town of San Nicolaas in Aruba. It covers the history of train traffic from 1875 to the present. The museum is on the ground floor of a private residence, and includes model trains from England, Germany, the U.S., and Canada, and a number of model planes and automobiles as well.

See also 
 List of museums in Aruba

References 

Museums in Aruba
2001 establishments in the Netherlands Antilles
Museums established in 2001
Buildings and structures in San Nicolaas
21st-century architecture in the Netherlands